The College of Agriculture and Life Sciences is one of eight colleges at Virginia Tech with a three-part mission of learning, discovery, and engagement and it is one of the best agriculture programs in the nation. It has more than 3,100 undergraduate and graduate students in a dozen academic departments. In 2013, the National Science Foundation ranked Virginia Tech No. 6 in the country for agricultural research expenditures, much of which originated from the College of Agriculture and Life Sciences.

As part of Virginia Tech's land-grant mission, the college administers Virginia Cooperative Extension in partnership with Virginia State University.

Departments
The college is home to a dozen academic departments:
 Agricultural and Applied Economics
 Agricultural, Leadership, and Community Education
 Animal and Poultry Sciences
 Biochemistry (with the College of Science)
 Biological Systems Engineering (with the College of Engineering)
 Dairy Science
 Entomology
 Food Science and Technology
 Human Nutrition, Foods and Exercise
 School of Plant and Environmental Sciences
 Crop and Soil Environmental Sciences
 Horticulture
 Plant Pathology, Physiology, and Weed Science

History

Founded in 1872 as a land-grant college named Virginia Agricultural and Mechanical College, Virginia Tech has evolved into a large public university with numerous degree offerings. The College of Agriculture and Life Sciences provides the kind of education intended under the Morrill Act of 1862, making it the center of the land-grant tradition at Virginia Tech. Closely associated with the college are the Virginia Agricultural Experiment Station, established in 1886, and Virginia Cooperative Extension, established in 1914.

Today, the College of Agriculture and Life Sciences has more than 21,000 alumni.

Academics

The college offers bachelor's degrees in 13 majors as well as an undecided option. The Agricultural Technology Program prepares students for careers in the agricultural and green industries with a concentrated, two-year degree experience that leads to an associate degree. Students specialize in either applied agricultural management or landscape and turf management.

Research
The college's Research division has identified six program areas as a focus for development and investment.

Together with the Virginia Tech College of Natural Resources and Environment and the Virginia-Maryland Regional College of Veterinary Medicine, the college administers the Virginia Agricultural Experiment Station, which allows faculty to investigate food and fiber systems, their impact on the environment, and natural and human resource issues. Eleven agricultural research and Extension centers, which are dispersed throughout Virginia's five geographical areas, support this research system.

Virginia Tech's research expenditures in the agricultural and life sciences have consistently ranked among the top in the nation. In 2009, these expenditures exceeded $91.6 million and accounted for more than 23 percent of Virginia Tech's research spending. Through research and Extension efforts, the college helped elevate the state's agricultural exports to record numbers. In 2013, exports in the commonwealth reached $2.85 billion.

See also
 Hahn Horticulture Garden

References

External links
 

Virginia Tech
Agricultural universities and colleges in the United States
1903 establishments in Virginia